Rowena Cordero-Erquieza (born November 1, 1966), professionally known as Winnie Cordero, is a Filipino comedian, actress and TV host.

Biography

Education
Cordero is a Communication Arts graduate from the University of Santo Tomas.

Career
Cordero started her career as a cast member in the live-action children's edutainment program Batibot when she was in her 3rd year of college. She started her career at DZMM from 1996 to 1997 when she talked with then DZMM anchor Joey Galvez who mentioned that DZMM needed a new voice to join him in his new showbiz program Showbiz Today.

Cordero was a host of the Philippine morning television show, Umagang Kay Ganda, a segment anchor of Winner sa Life! for TV Patrol and a co-anchor of DZMM's Todo-Todo Walang Preno with Ariel Ureta..  As of August 29, 2020, the former segment of TV Patrol's Winner Sa Life is now a newest weekly informative magazine program hosted by Cordero.

Filmography

Television

Film

Radio

References

External links

Living people
Filipino television journalists
Filipino radio journalists
Filipino women journalists
People from Manila
1966 births
ABS-CBN News and Current Affairs people
University of Santo Tomas alumni
Filipino women comedians
Filipino women television presenters